Sconsia grayi is a species of large sea snail, a marine gastropod mollusk in the family Cassidae, the helmet snails and bonnet snails.

Description 
The maximum recorded shell length is 71 mm.

Habitat 
Minimum recorded depth is 5 m. Maximum recorded depth is 640 m.

References

External links

Cassidae
Gastropods described in 1855